Beckley is a neighborhood of Louisville, Kentucky located along North Beckley Station Road and the Chenoweth Run watershed. It is sometimes referred to by its largest subdivision, Lake Forest.

References

Neighborhoods in Louisville, Kentucky